This is a list of school districts in Montana. Many schools in Montana are self-administered — that is, not part of a larger district — and are thus counted as individual districts by the state of Montana and the National Center for Education Statistics.

Beaverhead County

Beaverhead County High School
Dillon Elementary School
 Grant Elementary School
 Jackson Elementary School
Lima K-12 Schools
 Polaris Elementary School
 Reichle Elementary School
 Wisdom Elementary School
 Wise River Elementary School

Big Horn County

BIE
Northern Cheyenne Tribal School

Public

Hardin Elementary School/Hardin High School
Lodge Grass Elementary School/Lodge Grass High School
Plenty Coups High School
Pryor Elementary School
Wyola Elementary School

Blaine County

Chinook Elementary School/Chinook High School
Cleveland Elementary School
Harlem Elementary School/Harlem High School
Hays-Lodge Pole K-12 Schools
North Harlem Colony Elementary School
Turner Elementary School/Turner High School
Zurich Elementary School

Carbon County

Belfry K-12 Schools
Bridger K-12 Schools
Fromberg K-12 Schools
Joliet Elementary School/Joliet High School
Luther Elementary School
Red Lodge Elementary School/Red Lodge High School
Roberts K-12 Schools

Carter County

Alzada Elementary School
Carter County High School
Ekalaka Elementary School

Cascade County

Belt Elementary School/Belt High School
Cascade Elementary School/Cascade High School
Centerville Elementary School/Centerville High School
Great Falls Elementary School/Great Falls High School
Simms High School
Sun River Valley Elementary School
 Ulm Elementary School
 Vaughn Elementary School

Chouteau County

Big Sandy K-12 Schools
Carter Elementary School
Fort Benton Elementary School/Fort Benton High School
 Geraldine K-12 Schools
 Highwood K-12 Schools

Custer County

Custer County High School
Kinsey Elementary School
Miles City Elementary School
 SH Elementary School

Daniels County

Peerless K-12 Schools
Scobey K-12 Schools

Dawson County

 Dawson High School
 Deer Park Elementary School
Glendive Elementary School
Lindsay Elementary School
Richey Elementary School/Richey High School

Fallon County

Baker K-12 Schools
Plevna K-12 Schools

Fergus County

Ayers Elementary School
 Deerfield Elementary School
Denton Elementary School/Denton High School
Fergus High School
Grass Range Elementary School/Grass Range High School
Lewistown Elementary School
Moore Elementary School/Moore High School
Roy K-12 Schools
Winifred K-12 Schools

Flathead County

Bigfork Elementary School/Bigfork High School
Cayuse Prairie Elementary School
Columbia Falls Elementary School/Columbia Falls High School
Creston Elementary School
 Deer Park Elementary School
Evergreen Elementary School
Fair-Mont-Egan Elementary School
Flathead High School
Glacier High School
Helena Flats Elementary School
Kalispell Middle School
 Kila Elementary School
Marion Elementary School 
 Olney-Bissell Elementary School
Pleasant Valley Elementary School
 Smith Valley Elementary School
 Somers Lakeside Elementary School
 Swan River Elementary School
 West Glacier Elementary School
West Valley Elementary School 
Whitefish Elementary School/Whitefish High School

Gallatin County

Amsterdam Elementary School
Anderson Elementary School
Belgrade Elementary School/Belgrade High School
 Big Sky K-12 Schools
Bozeman Public Schools
 Cottonwood Elementary School (Gallatin County)
Gallatin Gateway Elementary School
Lamotte Elementary School
Malmborg Elementary School
Manhattan Elementary School/Manhattan High School
Monforton Elementary School
 Pass Creek Elementary School
 Springhill Elementary School
Three Forks Elementary School/Three Forks High School
West Yellowstone K-12
Willow Creek Elementary School/Willow Creek High School

Garfield County

Cohagen Elementary School
Garfield County High School
Jordan Elementary School
 Kester Elementary School
Pine Grove Elementary School
Ross Elementary School

Glacier County

Browning Elementary School/Browning High School
Cut Bank Elementary School/Cut Bank High School
 East Glacier Park Elementary School
Mountain View Elementary School

Golden Valley County

Lavina K-12 Schools
Ryegate K-12 Schools

Granite County

Drummond Elementary School/Drummond High School
Hall Elementary School
Philipsburg K-12 Schools

Hill County

Box Elder Elementary School/Box Elder High School
Cottonwood Elementary School (Hill County)
Havre Elementary School/Havre High School
North Star Elementary School/North Star High School
Rocky Boy Elementary School/Rocky Boy High School

Jefferson County

 Basin Elementary School
Boulder Elementary School
Cardwell Elementary School
Clancy Elementary School
Jefferson High School
Montana City Elementary School
Whitehall Elementary School/Whitehall High School

Judith Basin County

Geyser Elementary School/Geyser High School
Hobson K-12 Schools
Stanford K-12 Schools

Lake County

BIE
 Two Eagle River School

Public

Arlee Elementary School/Arlee High School
Charlo Elementary School/Charlo High School
 Dayton Elementary School
Polson Elementary School/Polson High School
Ronan Elementary School/Ronan High School
Saint Ignatius K-12 Schools
 Swan Lake-Salmon Elementary School
Valley View Elementary School

Lewis and Clark County

Auchard Creek Elementary School
Augusta Elementary School/Augusta High School
East Helena K-12 Schools
Helena Elementary School/Helena High School
Lincoln K-12 Schools
 Trinity Elementary School
 Wolf Creek Elementary School

Liberty County

Chester-Joplin-Inverness Elementary School/Chester-Joplin-Inverness High School
Liberty Elementary School

Lincoln County

Eureka Elementary School
 Fortine Elementary School
Libby K-12 Schools
Lincoln County High School
McCormick Elementary School
 Trego Elementary School
Troy Elementary School/Troy High School
 Yaak Elementary School

Madison County

Alder Elementary School
Ennis K-12 Schools
Harrison K-12 Schools
Sheridan Elementary School/Sheridan High School
Twin Bridges K-12 Schools

McCone County

Circle Elementary School/Circle High School
Vida Elementary School

Mineral County

Alberton K-12 Schools
Saint Regis K-12 Schools
Superior K-12 Schools

Missoula County

Bonner Elementary School
Clinton Elementary School
 DeSmet Elementary School
Frenchtown K-12 Schools
Hellgate Elementary School/Hellgate High School
Lolo Elementary School
Missoula Elementary School/Missoula High School
 Potomac Elementary School
Seeley Lake Elementary School
Swan Valley Elementary School
Target Range Elementary School
 Woodman Elementary School

Musselshell County

Melstone Elementary School/Melstone High School
Roundup Elementary School/Roundup High School

Park County

Arrowhead Elementary School
Cooke City Elementary School
Gardiner Elementary School/Gardiner High School
Livingston Elementary School
Park High School
 Pine Creek Elementary School
Shields Valley Elementary School/Shields Valley High School

Phillips County

Dodson K-12 Schools
Malta K-12 Schools
Saco Elementary School/Saco High School
Whitewater K-12 Schools

Pondera County

Conrad Elementary School/Conrad High School
Heart Butte K-12 Schools
Miami Elementary School District
Valier Elementary School/Valier High School

Powder River County

Broadus Elementary School
Powder River County District High School

Powell County

Avon Elementary School
Deer Lodge Elementary School
Powell County High School

Ravalli County

Corvallis K-12 Schools
Darby K-12 Schools
Florence-Carlton K-12 Schools
Hamilton K-12 Schools
Lone Rock Elementary School
Stevensville Elementary School/Stevensville High School
Victor K-12 Schools

Richland County

 Brorson Elementary School
Fairview Elementary School/Fairview High School
Lambert Elementary School/Lambert High School
 Rau Elementary School
Savage Elementary School/Savage High School
Sidney Elementary School/Sidney High School

Roosevelt County

Bainville K-12 Schools
Brockton Elementary School/Brockton High School
Culbertson Elementary School/Culbertson High School
Froid Elementary School/Froid High School
Frontier Elementary School
Poplar Elementary School/Poplar High School
Wolf Point Elementary School/Wolf Point High School

Rosebud County

Ashland Elementary School
Colstrip Elementary School/Colstrip High School
Forsyth K-12 Schools
Lame Deer K-12 Schools
Rosebud K-12 Schools

Sanders County

 Dixon Elementary School
 Hot Springs K-12 Schools
Noxon Elementary School/Noxon High School
 Plains K-12 Schools
Thompson Falls Elementary School/Thompson Falls High School
 Trout Creek Elementary School

Sheridan County

Medicine Lake K-12 Schools
Plentywood K-12 Schools
Westby K-12 Schools

Silver Bow County

Butte Elementary School/Butte High School
Melrose Elementary School
 Ramsay Elementary School

Stillwater County

Absarokee Elementary School/Absarokee High School
Columbus Elementary School/Columbus High School
Molt Elementary School
Park City Elementary School/Park City High School
Rapelje Elementary School/Rapelje High School
Reed Point Elementary School/Reed Point High School

Sweet Grass County

Big Timber Elementary School
McLeod Elementary School
Melville Elementary School
Sweet Grass County High School

Teton County

 Bynum Elementary School
Choteau Elementary School/Choteau High School
Dutton/Brady K-12 Schools
Fairfield Elementary School/Fairfield High School
 Golden Ridge Elementary School
 Greenfield Elementary School
 Pendroy Elementary School
Power Elementary School/Power High School

Toole County

Shelby Elementary School/Shelby High School
Sunburst K-12 Schools

Valley County

Frazer Elementary School/Frazer High School
Glasgow K-12 Schools
Hinsdale Elementary School/Hinsdale High School
Lustre Elementary School
Nashua K-12 Schools
Opheim K-12 Schools

Wheatland County

Harlowton Elementary School/Harlowton High School
Judith Gap Elementary School/Judith Gap High School

Yellowstone County

Billings Elementary School/Billings High School
Blue Creek Elementary School
Broadview Elementary School/Broadview High School
Canyon Creek Elementary School
Custer K-12 Schools
Elder Grove Elementary School
Elysian Elementary School
Huntley Project K-12 Schools
Independent Elementary School
Laurel Elementary School/Laurel High School
Lockwood Elementary School
Morin Elementary School
Pioneer Elementary School
Shepherd Elementary School/Shepherd High School
Yellowstone Academy Elementary School

Single-District Counties

Anaconda Elementary School/Anaconda High School (Deer Lodge County)
Hysham K-12 Schools (Treasure County)
Terry K-12 Schools (Prairie County)
Townsend K-12 Schools (Broadwater County)
White Sulphur Springs K-12 Schools (Meagher County)
Wibaux K-12 Schools
Winnett K-12 Schools (Petroleum County)

Montana
 
School districts
School districts